The Great Sioux Uprising is a 1953 American Western film directed by Lloyd Bacon and starring Jeff Chandler, Faith Domergue and Lyle Bettger.

Plot
During the Civil War, in Wyoming, horse dealers Joan Britton (Faith Domergue) and Stephen Cook (Lyle Bettger) are competing to supply the Union Army with horses. A Cherokee, Stan Watie, is in the area to stir up the Sioux against the Union just as Cook decides to steal a herd of Sioux horses. Ex-army doctor Jonathan Westgate (Jeff Chandler) opposes Cook's unscrupulous methods as well as being Cook's rival for the affections of Joan. It seems Westgate is the only one able to prevent a new Indian war.

Cast
 Jeff Chandler as Capt. Jonathan Westgate
 Faith Domergue as Joan Britton
 Lyle Bettger as Stephen Cook
 Peter Whitney as Ahab Jones
 Stacy Harris as Uriah
 Walter Sande as Joe Baird
 Stephen Chase as Maj. McKay
 Glenn Strange as Gen. Stan Watie
 Ray Bennett as Sgt. Manners
 John War Eagle as Chief Red Cloud
 Charles Arnt as Gist
 Julia Montoya as Heyoka
 Dewey Drapeau as Teo-Ka-Ha
 Boyd 'Red' Morgan as Ray
 Lane Bradford as Lee
 Jack Ingram as Sam 
 Clem Fuller as Jake

Production
In 1952 Jeff Chandler signed a new contract with Universal which doubled his salary. The Great Sioux Uprising was the first film under the new agreement. Alexis Smith and Stephen McNally were meant to co star with Chandler. Eventually Smith was replaced by Faith Domergue. McNally's wife then fell ill and he asked to withdraw from the film; he was replaced by Lyle Bettger. Filming took place in Portland and Pendleton, Oregon.

References

External links

1953 films
American historical films
Universal Pictures films
1950s historical films
1953 Western (genre) films
Films directed by Lloyd Bacon
Films set in Wyoming
American Western (genre) films
Films shot in Oregon
Films shot in Portland, Oregon
1950s English-language films
1950s American films